José Benito Saura Méndez (born 4 December 1978 in Murcia) is a paralympic athlete from Spain competing in category T11 800m events. He only competed once in the Paralympics, in 1996 when he was the second of three Spanish medalists in the T11 800m, splitting compatriots José Antonio Sánchez and Ruben Delgado.

References

External links 
 
 

1978 births
Living people
Paralympic athletes of Spain
Paralympic silver medalists for Spain
Paralympic medalists in athletics (track and field)
Athletes (track and field) at the 1996 Summer Paralympics
Medalists at the 1996 Summer Paralympics
Spanish male middle-distance runners
Visually impaired middle-distance runners
Paralympic middle-distance runners
20th-century Spanish people